Gogango is a rural town and locality in the Rockhampton Region, Queensland, Australia. In the  the locality of Gogango had a population of 111 people.

Geography 
Gogango is in Central Queensland. The Capricorn Highway traverses the south of the locality passing through the town which is situated in the south-east corner of the locality. The Central Western railway line also traverses the south of the locality mostly parallel and to the immediate north of the highway. The town is serviced by Gogango railway station , while Grantleigh railway station serves the south-west of the locality.

The Fitzroy River flows from west to east through the centre of the locality. Gogango Creek flows from south to north through the town and is a tributary of the Fitzroy River.

The principal land use is farming, mostly grazing cattle.

History
Goganjo Provisional School opened in 1874 but closed circa 1878. In 1888 it renamed under the name Gogango Provisional School (note change of spelling) becoming Gogango State School on 1 January 1909.

On 29 November 1950, the Gogango Hall held an Ambulance Ball. People from Westwood, Mt Morgan and Rockhampton attended.

In the 2010-11 Queensland floods the Fitzroy River which passes through the area of Gogango rose to 28 metres. Gogango Creek also flooded, stopping traffic on  the Capricorn Highway.

At the 2011 census, Gogango and the surrounding area had a population of 310.

The Capricorn Highway was also flooded for more than 12 hours in January 2013. 

In February 2015, Cyclone Marcia caused heavy rainfall which led to Gogango Creek rising over the highway.

Infrastructure
Rookwood Weir, currently under construction, is located on the Fitzroy River in the Gogango area, about 15 km from the township. When completed the $72 million weir will hold over 100 thousand megalitres. The Weir will be built over 2 stages, The first stage will be 17 metres high and the second stage will be 0.5 metre, With a complete height of 17.5 meters, inundating 1,930 hectares.

Economy 
There are a number of homesteads in the locality, including:

 Rookwood
 Separation
 Weir Park
 Yarra

Transport 
There are a number of airstrips in the locality, all of them associated with the homesteads:

 Rookwood airstrip
Separation airstrip
Weir Park airstrip
 Yarra airstrip

Education 
Gogango State School is a government primary (Prep-6) school for boys and girls at 10 Wills Street. In 2016, the school had an enrolment of 9 students with 3 teachers (1 full-time equivalent) and 4 non-teaching staff (2 full-time equivalent). In 2018, the school had an enrolment of 7 students with 4 teachers (2 full-time equivalent) and 4 non-teaching staff (1 full-time equivalent).

There is no secondary school in Gogango. The nearest state secondary school is Rockhampton State High School in Wandal in Rockhampton to the north-east. A school bus service is available.

Facilities 
Dunphy Park is at the corner of Third Street and Wills Street. It has picnic tables and shade areas.

There is a community hall where the Gogango Honour Roll is displayed.

There is a volunteer rural fire brigade.

Notable people
 Barry O'Sullivan, Australian Senator, was born in Gogango

References

External links 
 

Towns in Queensland
Suburbs of Rockhampton Region
Localities in Queensland